Chaurpati (Nepali: चौरपाटी ) is a Gaupalika(Nepali: गाउपालिका ; gaupalika) in Achham District in the Sudurpashchim Province of far-western Nepal. 
Chaurpati has a population of 25149.The land area is 182.16 km2.

It was formed by merging Siudi, Sokot, Payal, Lunnga, Marku and Duni VDSs. Currently, it is divided into 7 administrative wards.

References

Rural municipalities in Achham District
Rural municipalities of Nepal established in 2017